Todorović is a Serbian surname derived from a masculine given name Todor. It may refer to:
Marko Todorović (June 2, 1929 – August 29, 2000), a Serbian actor
Bora Todorović (born November 5, 1930), a Serbian actor
Dragan Todorović (politician) (born January 25, 1953), a Serbian politician
Dragan Todorović (born September 1958), a Serbian writer
Srđan Todorović (born March 28, 1965), a Serbian actor
Rade Todorović (born May 21, 1974), a retired Serbian soccer player
Nenad Todorović (born May 26, 1982), a Serbian soccer player
Ognjen Todorović (born March 24, 1989), a Bosnian soccer player
Zorana Todorović (born December 30, 1989), a Serbian basketball player
Darko Todorović (born May 5, 1997), a Bosnian soccer player

Serbian surnames
Patronymic surnames
Surnames from given names